Boaz Davidson (born 8 November 1943) is an Israeli film director, producer and screenwriter. He was born in Tel Aviv, Israel and studied film in London at London Film School.

Biography
Davidson was born in Tel Aviv, Israel, to a Jewish family. He started his career by directing the television show Lool (1969) and the music documentary Shablul (1970). Later he directed Israeli cult films such as Charlie Ve'hetzi (1974) and Hagiga B'Snuker (1975). In 1974 he directed the film Mishpahat Tzan'ani. He directed the first four films in the Eskimo Limon series (Eskimo Limon (1978), Yotzim Kavua (1979), Shifshuf Naim (1981), Sapiches (1982). Eskimo Limon was entered into the 28th Berlin International Film Festival in 1978. In 1986 he directed the cult film Alex Holeh Ahavah.

In 1979 Davidson moved from Israel to the United States and started working as a director, directing a remake of Eskimo Limon, The Last American Virgin in 1982.

Davidson continued to work in the United States as a producer and a screenwriter. He was involved in producing several major films including 16 Blocks, The Wicker Man, The Black Dahlia, 2008's Rambo and The Expendables. He is also listed as a producer in the thriller Trespass.

Filmography

References

External links 

1943 births
Living people
Film people from Tel Aviv
Jews in Mandatory Palestine
Israeli Jews
Israeli film directors
Israeli film producers
Israeli male screenwriters
Alumni of the London Film School